The Amphitheatre of Pompeii is one of the oldest surviving Roman amphitheatres. It is located in the ancient Roman city of Pompeii, and was buried by the eruption of Vesuvius in 79 AD, that also buried the city of Pompeii and the neighbouring town of Herculaneum.

Six bodies were found during the excavations.

Design and construction

Built around 70 BC, the amphitheatre is one of the earliest Roman amphitheatres built of stone; previously, they had been built out of wood.

Contemporarily, it was known as a spectacula rather than an amphitheatrum, since the latter term was not yet in use at the time. It was built with the private funds of Gaius Quinctius Valgus and Marcus Porcius (a relative of Julius Caesar's rival). The space was constructed shortly after Pompeii's induction as a Roman colony, and an inscription on the amphitheatre honoring the donors, Gaius Quinctius Valgus and Marcus Porcius, cites one of their motives, being, "to demonstrate the honour of the colony," perhaps indicating the amphitheatre's role in establishing Roman influence in Pompeii.

The design is seen by some modern crowd control specialists as near-optimal. The design of the lower entrances for higher-class citizens, who would been seated closest to the pit, have been noted for their facility in curating unique viewership experiences—viewers would be struck by both the beams of light flooding the dark tunnel and the roar of the crowd as they entered the amphitheatre, creating a highly stimulating and dramatic experience.

Its washroom, located in the neighbouring palaestra has also been cited as an inspiration for better bathroom design in modern stadiums.

The amphitheatre measures 135m long and 104m wide. The arena (pit) is measured to be 6m below ground level. and measures 66.7m long and 35.1m wide. The only internal features of the amphitheatre at Pompeii were a corridor that cut into the base of cavea. This corridor ran the circumference of the amphitheatre and is used to access the arena.

Gladiatorial contests

The preservation of Pompeii and its amphitheatre have given insights into the gladiatorial culture of Rome. Painted posters on the walls of the amphitheatre have been uncovered depicting gladiators accompanied by slogans and nicknames, evoking shades of the modern posters, billboards, and banners depicting today's sports stars and celebrities. For example, one poster declares a gladiator to be the "Heart throb of the girls." One of the most notable events in the amphitheatre's history occurred around 59 AD, when a deadly brawl occurred between Pompeiians and residents of Nuceria during games in the amphitheatre, resulting in a 10-year ban on such events.

Earthquake 
The amphitheater was damaged by an earthquake in 62 AD. The magistrate Cuspius Pansa and his son undertook its restoration.

Modern uses
Aside from being a historical landmark and an object of archaeological study, the amphitheatre has been used for concerts and other public events in modern times.
Over a 4-day period in October 1971, Pink Floyd made a concert film at the amphitheatre, titled Pink Floyd: Live at Pompeii. David Gilmour, the band's guitarist, returned to perform two concerts at the amphitheatre in July 2016 as part of his Rattle That Lock Tour. 

In September 1991, Frank Sinatra was granted special permission by the site's chief archaeologist to perform in the amphitheatre.

In 2015 a temporary museum was installed in the centre of the amphitheater. The pyramidal structure was designed to resemble Mount Vesuvius, and housed the installation "Pompeii and Europe from 1748 to 1943", which displayed casts of 20 victims of the eruption and photographs of the excavations.

Gilmour's 2016 concerts saw the first public performances in the amphitheatre since 79 AD and are featured on the live album/video Live at Pompeii. 

In 2018, the venue hosted a live performance to an audience by progressive rock group King Crimson.

See also 
 Theatre Area of Pompeii
 List of Roman amphitheatres

References

Bibliography

Further reading 
 BBC, "Pompeii Art and Architecture Gallery", Joanne Berry (accessed 7 May 2009)
 'CSO: Security and Risk', "Modern Crowd Control Lessons (from Ancient Pompeii)", Scott Berinato, 18 May 2007 (accessed 7 May 2009)
 University of Chicago, "Amphitheatrum", James Grout, 'Encyclopaedia Romana' (accessed 7 May 2009)

External links

3D model of Pompeii Amphitheatre

70 BC
Buildings and structures completed in the 1st century BC
Pompeii (ancient city)
Roman amphitheatres in Italy
Ruins in Italy
1748 archaeological discoveries
Sports riots